Edmund Bolesław Fryde, FBA (16 July 1923 – 17 November 1999) was a Polish-born British historian of medieval England and the early Renaissance.

Biography
Fryde was a son of Mieczysław (Matthew) Fryde, a prominent Polish-Jewish lawyer and economic historian, and Salomea Ludwika (Sarah Louise) Rosenzweig, both originally from Częstochowa. He grew up in Warsaw and came to the United Kingdom to study at Bradfield College in 1938. He took his undergraduate degree at Balliol College, University of Oxford (1942–4) and completed his doctoral thesis there in 1947. He was Lecturer in Economic History, then Professor at the University College of Wales, Aberystwyth from 1947 to 1990. Over the course of his research career, he moved from the study of medieval economics to intellectual history.

Fryde was married to Natalie Davies, his former student, from 1966 to 1981. He was a cousin of the novelist Uri Orlev.

Books
The Wool Accounts of William de la Pole: A Study of Some Aspects of the English Wool Trade at the Start of the Hundred Years (1964)
Studies in Medieval Trade and Finance (1983)
Humanism and Renaissance Historiography (1983)
Peasants and Landlords in Later Medieval England c.1380–c.1525 (1996)
The Early Palaeologan Renaissance (1261–c.1360) (2000)

Notes

References
 
 Obituary. Professor Edmund Fryde The Independent. Retrieved 25 February 2023 
 Obituary The Guardian. 2 December 1999. Retrieved 25 February 2023

External links

1923 births
1999 deaths
Fellows of the British Academy
Academics of Aberystwyth University
British Jews
People educated at Bradfield College
Alumni of Balliol College, Oxford
Polish emigrants to the United Kingdom
Historians of England